That Maritime Feelin' was a Canadian music variety television series which aired on CBC Television in 1977.

Premise
Marg Osburne (Don Messer's Jubilee) hosted this Halifax-produced series which featured Atlantic Canadian musicians and a studio audience. It was produced by Jack O'Neil (The Sunshine Hour).

Guests included Jim Bennet, John Allan Cameron, Wilf Carter, Stompin' Tom Connors, Shirley Eikhard, Patsy Gallant, Noel Harrison, Catherine McKinnon, Gene McLellan, Kenzie McNeil, Anne Murray, Stan Rogers and Ken Tobias.

The series ended following Osburne's death on 16 July 1977. A tribute broadcast was presented in the show's time slot on 22 July 1977.

Scheduling
The half-hour series was broadcast Fridays at 7:30 p.m. (Eastern) from 8 April to 15 July 1977.

References

External links
 

CBC Television original programming
1977 Canadian television series debuts
1977 Canadian television series endings
1970s Canadian variety television series
Television shows filmed in Halifax, Nova Scotia